Julia Tolofua (born 1 June 1997) is a French judoka.

She won a medal at the 2021 World Judo Championships.

She won one of the bronze medals in her event at the 2022 Judo Grand Slam Paris held in Paris, France. She also won one of the bronze medals in her event at the 2022 Judo Grand Slam Tel Aviv held in Tel Aviv, Israel. She won one of the bronze medals in her event at the 2022 Judo Grand Slam Antalya held in Antalya, Turkey.

She lived in several different places as a child as her father served in the French Foreign Legion. Two of her cousins and an uncle played rugby union at the highest level.

On 12 November 2022 she won a gold medal at the 2022 European Mixed Team Judo Championships as part of team France.

References

External links
 
 
 

1997 births
Living people
French female judoka
French people of Wallis and Futuna descent